Colvin may refer to:

 Colvin (surname)
 Colvin family, the Anglo-Indian administrators and soldiers

Places

United States
 Colvin Mountain, a ridge in Alabama
 Colvin Township, Minnesota, a township
 Colvin Township, in Eddy County, North Dakota

See also
 
 Calvin (disambiguation)